Shahrak-e Halateh is a village in Howmeh-ye Kerend Rural District, in the Central District of Dalahu County, Kermanshah Province, Iran. At the 2006 census, its population was 369, in 95 families.

References 

Populated places in Dalahu County